Lishan Constructing Administrative Bureau was a county level administrative body in Taiwan between 1973 and 1981.

History 
In early years, Lishan was a tribe of Atayal people, named Slamaw in Atayal language. It was administered by Tōsei District, Taichū Prefecture in the Japanese era, and by Hoping Township, Taichung County after World War II. In 1960s, opening of the Central Cross-Island Highway brought agricultures of high return Temperate fruit. This made Lishan one of the richest region in Taiwan at that time.
 July 11, 1967, Lishan Region Constructing Commission was established under the Department of Civil Affairs, Taiwan Provincial Government.
 July 1, 1973, Lishan Constructing Administrative Bureau was established as a county level division within Taiwan Province.
 May 1, 1981, the bureau was reformed as Lishan Scenic Area Administrative Office under the Department of Transportation, Taiwan Provincial Government.
Currently it is called Lisan Administrative Office within the Tri-Mountain National Scenic Area managed by Tourism Bureau, Ministry of Transportation and Communications.

Administration 
The Magistrate of Lishan Constructing Administrative Bureau was appointed by the Taiwan Provincial Government. All budgets of the bureau were directly from the provincial government. However, the resident in the territory of the bureau elected legislators to supervise officials and budget of the bureau in Taichung County Council and Hoping Township Council quoting the precedence of Yangmingshan Administrative Bureau.

Division hierarchy

See also 
 Yangmingshan Administrative Bureau
 Taichung

1973 establishments in Taiwan